Koleshchatovka is a rural locality (a selo) in Bugayevskoye Rural Settlement, Kantemirovsky  District, Voronezh Oblast, Russia. The population was 308 as of 2010. There are 2 streets.

Geography 
Koleshchatovka is located 15 km south of Kantemirovka (the district's administrative centre) by road. Kantemirovka is the nearest rural locality.

References 

Rural localities in Kantemirovsky District